The 1932 Missouri gubernatorial election was held on November 8, 1932 and resulted in a victory for the Democratic nominee, judge Guy Brasfield Park, over the Republican candidate, Lt. Governor Edward Henry Winter, and several other candidates representing minor parties. Park was nominated after the original nominee Francis M. Wilson died. Winter had defeated Secretary of State Charles U. Becker for his party's nomination.

Results

References

Missouri
1932
Gubernatorial
November 1932 events in the United States